Reizō, Reizo or Reizou (written: 礼三, 禮三 or 黎三) is a masculine Japanese given name. Notable people with the name include:

, Japanese footballer
, Japanese swimmer
, Japanese voice actor

Japanese masculine given names